The Lake Superior State Lakers men's ice hockey team is a National Collegiate Athletic Association (NCAA) Division I college ice hockey program that represents Lake Superior State University. The Lakers are a member of the Central Collegiate Hockey Association (CCHA). They play at the Taffy Abel Arena in Sault Ste. Marie, Michigan.

History

NAIA years 
The Lake Superior State men's ice hockey program began in 1966 as a member of the NAIA, under coach Ron Mason. The Lakers won the first program game with a 7-0 shutout of the VFW Chippewas. The shutout and win streak continued through the team's second ever game when Lake Superior State College won 2-0 against the Sault (Ont.) Rapids. The Lakers finished their inaugural season 15-5-0.

The Lakers joined the International Collegiate Hockey Association (ICHA) its second season and stayed in the league through the 1973-74 season. The Lakers swept their first league series in program history with two high scoring games against Lakehead, winning 9-4 on November 18, 1967 and 8-6 the following night. The pattern continued as Lake Superior swept through the regular season and advanced to the programs first ever post-season tournament appearance in the 1968 NAIA Ice Hockey Tournament. The Lakers won their first ever playoff game in deciding fashion 7-1 over Gustavus Adolphus College. Lake Superior's run was ended in the 1968 NAIA Championship game when they lost to Bemidji State 4-5. History repeated itself the following season when Lake Superior again fell to Bemidji in the 1969 NAIA Championship 5-6. The Lakers finished the season with a record of 21-5-1, the only losses on the season coming at the hands of the Beavers.

In the 1969-70 season Lake Superior again advanced through the ICHA regular season and the ICHA to the 1970 NAIA Tournament. Lake Superior advanced to the championship game against Bemidji State for the third straight season with a dominating 22-3 win over Alaska Methodist. The Lakers fell to Bemidji State 4-7, the third straight loss to Bemidji State in the NAIA Championship game.

The 1970-71 season marked the first season since the inaugural 1966-67 season that the Lakers failed to make the NAIA tournament, finishing the season with a record of 13-9-4. The Lakers joined the Central Collegiate Hockey Association (CCHA) as one of the founding members of the league in 1971 and began play in the CCHA for the 1972-73 season. Lake Superior also remained in the ICHA and NAIA. The Lakers picked up their first CCHA victory on November 4, 1972 when they beat Saint Louis University 7-3. The team qualified for the NAIA Championship Tournament after not receiving a bid in the past season. The Lakers defeated Wisconsin State 12-2 and defeated Gustavus Adolphus 9-3 to win the program's first ever National Championship. Lake Superior fell to Lakehead in the 1973 NAIA Championship Tournament, marking the Lakers first post season loss not in the Championship game, but rebounded the next day with an 11-3 win over Gustavus Adolphus for the NAIA Third Place game. Following the 1973-74 season Ron Mason left to become the head coach at Bowling Green, Mason was replaced by Rick Comley.

The 1973-74 season marked a historic year for the Lakers ice hockey program. Lake Superior State finished the regular season and qualified for the 1974 NAIA Championship Tournament. The Lakers advanced to the NAIA Final Four with a 7-1 victory over Concordia College (MN), then picked up a deciding 9-2 win over St. Thomas to advance into the NAIA Championship against rival Bemidji State. The Lakers won their second NAIA Championship with a 4-1 victory over the Beavers. The championship was not the end of the season, as the Lakers also received a bid to the CCHA Tournament. Lake Superior won their first ever CCHA playoff game against Western Michigan but fell in the CCHA Championship to Saint Louis 3-8. The Lakers also advanced to the National Invitational Tournament held in Saint Louis, Missouri but fell 2-3 to Vermont and 1-9 to CCHA rival Saint Louis. The 1973-74 also marked Lake Superiors last season as a member of the NAIA for ice hockey.

Championship era 
Frank Anzalone took over mid-season in 1983 after a period of mediocrity over the previous several seasons. Under Anzalone LSSU would turn around from an 11th-place CCHA finish to second in the CCHA two seasons later in 1984-85. The Lakers advanced to the CCHA Championship with a win over Bowling Green but lost to Michigan State 5-1 at Joe Louis Arena in Detroit, Michigan. Despite the second place CCHA finish LSSU qualified for the 1985 NCAA tournament, the school's first ever NCAA Tournament appearance for ice hockey. Lake Superior fell to Rensselaer 7-3 in the first of the three game series and came up short with a 3-3 tie in the second game. RPI would go on in the tournament to become the National Champions.

Two seasons later in the 1987-88 season Anzalone led the Lakers to the teams' first 30-win season. Lake Superior State won the CCHA Regular Season Champions but finished as the CCHA Tournament Runner-Up with a 5-3 loss to Bowling Green. Lake State advanced to the NCAA Tournament and outscored Merrimack by a combined score of 9-3 in two games and advanced to the Frozen Four against Maine. The Lakers came away with a 6-3 win, giving LSSU their first ever appearance in the NCAA Championship game. Lake Superior took on St. Lawrence in the championship and won their first NCAA National Championship, thanks to Mark Vermette's goal that gave the Lakers a 4-3 overtime win. Laker Goalie Bruce Hoffort was named the Most Outstanding Player of the 1988 Frozen Four. Lake Superior State University is the smallest school in NCAA history to win a Division 1 national championship.

Lake Superior received at-large bids the following two season in 1989 and 1990 but championship hopes ended in the first round with back-to-back first round losses at the hands of Harvard and Colgate.

Following the 1989-90 season and the NCAA First Round loss to Colgate, Anzalone left to coach the Newmarket Saints of the AHL and later other minor league professional teams. Jeff Jackson took over the program and continued the winning tradition of the Lakers. In his first season as head coach at Lake Superior Jackson led the team to a CCHA Regular Season Championship and CCHA Tournament Championship through a tough 6-5 OT win over Michigan. The CCHA Championship gave Lake Superior an automatic bid to the 1991 NCAA Tournament where the team would lose 2 games to 1 of a three-game first round series against Clarkson.

In Jackson's second season, the 1991-1992 Lakers would finish 20-8-4 in the CCHA, good enough for 2nd in the final standings behind Michigan. The Lakers swept Illinois-Chicago in a 2-0 sweep in the Soo to advance to Detroit, Michigan for the CCHA Finals. After knocking off Michigan State 5-3, the Lakers would win their second straight CCHA Playoff Championship, in a rematch of the previous season with a 3-1 win over Michigan. Lake Superior advanced through the NCAA Tournament with wins over Alaska-Anchorage, Minnesota and CCHA and in-state rival Michigan State. Lake Superior won their second NCAA Championship with a 5-3 win over Wisconsin.

The 1992-1993 Lakers went 32-8-5, 20-5-5 in the CCHA (3rd place). In the CCHA playoffs, the Lakers swept Illinois-Chicago in a best 2-out-of-3 series in the Soo behind Rob Valicevic's 4 goals. In Detroit, the Lakers destroyed Bowling Green 7-1, again paced by Valicevic's hat-trick. In the semifinals, the Lakers and Wolverines would square off. Behind Wayne Strachan's hat-trick and 19-saves by Blaine Lacher, the Lakers knocked off Michigan, 5-3. The Lakers would win the CCHA Title for a third straight season with a 3-0 shutout of CCHA Regular Season Champion Miami (OH), and advanced to the NCAA Tournament. In the West Regional in Detroit, the Lakers would open up with Minnesota-Duluth. With the game tied a 1-1, the Lakers' Brian Rolston scored two goals in 59-seconds to give LSSU the lead for good in a 4-3 victory. The win over Minnesota-Dultuth sent the Lakers their second straight Frozen Four. In the national semi-final, played in Milwaukee, Wisconsin, the Lakers faced off with perennial powerhouse, Boston University. The Lakers jumped out to a 2-0 first period lead behind goals by Kurt Miller and Brian Rolston. The Lakers would not look back and would knock-off the Terriers 6-1, while Maine defeated fellow-CCHA rival Michigan, 4-3 in overtime. In the 1993 NCAA Championship game, the Lakers would face the Maine Black Bears, led by future NHL star Paul Kariya and Maine's all-time leading scorer Jim Montgomery. Maine's Patrice Tardif and Chris Ferraro gave Maine a 2-1 lead after the first period. The Lakers roared back in the second period with goals from Clayton Beddoes, John Hendry, and Wayne Strachan to take a 4-2 lead after two periods. However, Montgomery's natural hat-trick in the 3rd period lead the Black Bears to a 5-4 lead. Lake Superior State's Sean Tallaire says he scored to tie the game 5-5 with 50 seconds left, and his coach, Jeff Jackson, recounts that Tallaire returned to the team's bench and exclaimed, "That puck was in, Coach!" The NCAA did not yet have video review, and the game's official result ended with Maine leading 5-4. Jackson would later obtain film from the game and said that "Every time I watched the clip, I noticed something was weird. So I kept on rewinding it back on the old VHS systems and trying to determine. You couldn’t see the puck go in the net. But what I did see was the skate lace tying down the water bottle on the top of the net, flying in the air. That’s when I knew the puck had gone in.” Later, high quality film of this moment was broadcast during a November 1993 game involving Lake Superior State and Vermont that appears to show it was indeed a goal scored by Tallaire to tie the 1993 championship game. Curiously, the NCAA actually sent Jeff Jackson a commemorative award plaque bestowing Lake Superior State University as the 1993 Men's Ice Hockey National Champions. Jackson believes this was possibly due to sanctions that the Maine hockey program received in 1993 for recruiting violations. Brian Rolston and Michael Smith were named to the all-tournament team.

The 1993-1994 season began as a potential rebuilding season for Coach Jackson and the Lakers. With a line-up that included 12 freshman, very few people outside of Sault Ste. Marie expected the Lakers to make a third straight trip to the Frozen Four. However, the Lakers put together a 31-10-4regular season, and a 2nd place CCHA finish with an 18-8-4 record. Lake Superior State lost the 1994 CCHA Championship game 3-0 to the Michigan Wolverines, but the Lakers' received an at-large bid to the 1994 Tournament. The underdog Lakers would play in the West Regional in East Lansing, Michigan. In the opener, the Lakers played in one of the most controversial NCAA regional games in history against Northeastern. Late in the 3rd period, and the game deadlocked at 5-5, Northeastern's Dan Lupo appeared the give the Huskies a 6-5 lead. However, the officials ruled that the entire puck had not crossed the goal line, thus negating the potential go ahead goal. The Lakers won the game, 6-5, with an overtime winner just 15-seconds into the extra frame. In the second game of the NCAA Regional, the Lakers again matched up with the Michigan Wolverines, a team who had won both the CCHA Regular Season and Playoff Championships and had beaten the Lakers four times during the season. The Lakers and Wolverines would play to a 4-4 score at the end of regulation, with the Lakers upsetting Michigan with an overtime goal 5-4. In the national semi-finals, played in St.Paul, Minnesota, the Lakers again won in overtime, this time beating Harvard, 3-2. The streak of overtime games was snapped in St. Paul, Minnesota when the Lakers exploded to a 9-1 win over Boston University to win the program's third NCAA Division I Men's Hockey Title.

Jeff Jackson would coach the Lakers for two more seasons, making the NCAA Tournament in both 1995 and 1996. The team would lose in Regional Final games both seasons against Boston University in a rematch of the 1994 Championship and to Vermont in 1996. The Lakers would not advance to the NCAA Tournament again for 25 years. Jackson stepped down as head coach of Lake Superior to become the national coach and senior director of the newly founded U.S. National Team Development Program in Ann Arbor, Michigan. Anzalone and Jackson combined to lead to the program to an impressive run, Lake Superior appeared in the NCAA Tournament for nine consecutive seasons. Those nine seasons included three NCAA Division I Championships and one runner-up spot.

Post-championship era 
Lake Superior returned to a cool period after Jackson left the program. After five lacklustre seasons under Scott Borek, Frank Anzalone returned to the program in 2001 but hopes that the program would be turned around to its former glory faded after four seasons where the Lakers failed to reach the 10-win mark. Former Laker Jim Roque became coach in 2005 and, in his second season, led the Lakers to the team's first 20-win season since 1996.  However, in 2014, after obtaining only three winning seasons in nine years, Roque was let go.

In 2010 the university announced a $5 million project to renovate and expand the James Norris Center, the athletic and recreational facility that houses the Taffy Abel Arena. The renovations will include expansion of areas around the LSSU Hockey locker room. With expanded coaches offices and spaces, a training room, equipment room, and athletic training offices.

In the summer of 2011, the Big Ten Conference announced intentions to begin sponsoring men's ice hockey in 2013, followed by Miami (OH) announcing the formation of the National Collegiate Hockey Conference for 2013 with and five other schools breaking from the WCHA. The realignment continued on July 20, 2011, when Northern Michigan was approved for membership in the WCHA beginning with the 2013-2014 season. On August 23, 2011 members of the WCHA and CCHA met in Chicago, Illinois in reaction to the 2011 college hockey realignment. The WCHA then sent invitations to the five remaining CCHA schools. The Lakers quickly accepted their invitation to join the conference for the 2013-14 season, followed by several other CCHA members.

Return to glory 
Damon Whitten was named the 10th head coach of the Lakers in April 2014. In 2018-19, Whitten's fifth season as LSSU's coach, the Lakers won 23 games, which was Lake State's first season with over 20 wins since 2006-07 and the most wins the program had seen in a single season since 1995-96. Whitten also guided the Lakers to their first ever Great Lakes Invitational championship in program history on New Year's Eve in 2018.

In 2019, Lake Superior State was one of seven members of the men's WCHA that announced that they would leave after the 2020–21 season to form a new conference. In February 2020, the schools announced that their new league would be a revived CCHA.

In the 2020–21 season, the last for the men's WCHA, Whitten's Lakers finished second in the regular season of the WCHA, the school's best conference performance since 1995-96, and won the 2021 WCHA tournament, the program's first WCHA championship since joining the league in 2013. As the winner of the WCHA tournament, the Lakers secured an automatic bid to the 2021 NCAA tournament, ending a 25-year absence from the national tournament and earning their 11th appearance all-time.

The Lakers also reached a milestone of 1,000 wins in program history in March 2021.

Season-by-season results

Coaches

All-time coaching records 
As of the completion of 2022–23 season

† Bill Selman resigned in December 1982.

Awards and honors

US Hockey Hall of Fame
United States Hockey Hall of Fame members include:

Ron Mason (2013)
Doug Weight (2013)

NCAA

Spencer Penrose Award
Frank Anzalone: 1988

Tournament Most Outstanding Player
Bruce Hoffort: 1988
Paul Constantin: 1992
Sean Tallaire: 1994

AHCA First Team All-Americans

1987-88: Mark Vermette, F
1988-89: Bruce Hoffort, G; Kord Cernich, D
1990-91: Darrin Madeley, G; Jim Dowd, F
1991-92: Darrin Madeley, G; Mark Astley, D
1995-96: Keith Aldridge, D

AHCA Second Team All-Americans

1989-90: Kord Cernich, D; Jim Dowd, F
1990-91: Karl Johnston, D; Doug Weight, F
1992-93: Michael Smith, D; Brian Rolston, F
1993-94: Clayton Beddoes, F
1994-95: Keith Aldridge, D
1995-96: Sean Tallaire, F
1999-00: Jayme Platt, G

WCHA

Individual awards

Rookie of the Year
 Alex Globke: 2014

Most Outstanding Player in Tournament
 Ashton Calder: 2021

All-Conference Teams
First Team All-WCHA

2013–14: Kevin Czuczman, D
2016–17: Mitch Hults, F
2018–19: Diego Cuglietta, F

Second Team All-WCHA

2013–14: Kevin Kapalka, G
2015–16: Gordon Defiel, G
2019–20: Max Humitz, F
2020–21: Mareks Mitens, G; Ashton Calder, F

Third Team All-WCHA

2018–19: Max Humitz, F; Anthony Nellis, F
2020–21: Pete Veillette, F

WCHA All-Rookie Team

2013–14: Alex Globke, F
2016–17: Max Humitz, F
2019–20: Louis Boudon, F

CCHA

Individual awards

Player of the Year
Mark Vermette: 1988
Bruce Hoffort: 1989
Jim Dowd: 1991

Rookie of the Year
Steve Mulholland: 1980

Coach of the Year
Frank Anzalone: 1988
Jeff Jackson: 1991
Scott Borek: 2000

Terry Flanagan Memorial Award
Steve McJannet: 2006
Domenic Monardo: 2012

Best Defensive Forward
Pete Stauber: 1990
Jeff Napierala: 1991
Wayne Strachan: 1995
Bates Battaglia: 1996
Terry Marchant: 1998

Best Offensive Defenseman
Mark Astley: 1992
Keith Aldridge: 1996

Best Defensive Defenseman
Dan Keczmer: 1990
Karl Johnston: 1991
Mike Matteucci: 1996

Tournament Most Valuable Player
Clayton Beddoes: 1991
Darrin Madeley: 1992
Blaine Lacher: 1993
Wayne Strachan: 1995

Perani Cup
Jeff Jakaitis: 2006

Ilitch Humanitarian Award
Bo Cheesman: 2005

All-Conference Teams
First Team All-CCHA

1972–73: Bill Slewidge, D
1973–74: Pat Tims, G; Tom Davies, D; Kim Gellert, F
1987–88: Bruce Hoffort, G; Mark Vermette, F
1988–89: Bruce Hoffort, G; Kord Cernich, D
1989–90: Kord Cernich, D
1990–91: Darrin Madeley, G; Karl Johnston, D; Jim Dowd, F; Doug Weight, F
1991–92: Darrin Madeley, G; Mark Astley, D
1992–93: Brian Rolston, F
1994–95: Keith Aldridge, D
1995–96: Keith Aldridge, D; Sean Tallaire, F
1999–00: Jayme Platt, G
2005–06: Jeff Jakaitis, G

Second Team All-CCHA

1972–73: Don Muio, G; Julio Francella, F
1973–74: Bill Slewidge, D
1974–75: Marc Gaudreault, D; Mike Gaba, F; Julio Francella, F
1975–76: Mike Gaba, F; Kim Gellert, F
1976–77: Pat Tims, G
1978–79: Murray Skinner, G; Ron Sandzik, F
1979–80: Steve Mulholland, F
1984–85: Allan Butler, F
1987–88: Kord Cernich, D; Mike de Carle, F
1989–90: Darrin Madeley, G; Dan Keczmer, D; Jim Dowd, F
1990–91: Mark Astley, D
1991–92: Steven Barnes, D; Sandy Moger, F
1992–93: Michael Smith, D
1993–94: Keith Aldridge, D; Clayton Beddoes, F
1994–95: Joe Blaznek, F; Jason Sessa, F
1997–98: Terry Marchant, F
2006–07: Jeff Jakaitis, G; Derek Smith, D
2021–22: Jacob Bengtsson, D; Louis Boudon, F

CCHA All-Rookie Team

1989–90: Darrin Madeley, G; Doug Weight, F
1990–91: Steven Barnes, D; Clayton Beddoes, F
1992–93: Sean Tallaire, F
2010–11: Kevin Kapalka, G
2021–22: Josh Nixon, F

Statistical leaders

Career points leaders

Career goaltending leaders

GP = Games played; Min = Minutes played; W = Wins; L = Losses; T = Ties; GA = Goals against; SO = Shutouts; SV% = Save percentage; GAA = Goals against average

Minimum 1000 minutes

Statistics current through the start of the 2021-22 season.

Lake Superior State Athletic Hall of Fame
The following is a list of people associated with the Lake Superior State men's ice hockey program who were elected into the Lake Superior State Athletic Hall of Fame (induction date in parenthesis).

Rick Comley (1996)
Archie Orazietti (1996)
Ron Mason (1996)
Randy McArthur (1996)
Jim Booth (1997)
James Wiley (1997)
Steve Mulholland (1998)
Chris Dahlquist (1999)
Tom Davies (2000)
Julio Francella (2000)
1971–72 Team (2001)
Frank Anzalone (2001)
Bill Slewidge (2002)
Pat Tims (2003)
1973–74 Team (2003)
1987–88 Team (2005)
Jeff Jackson (2009)
Bill Crawford (2009)
Jim Dowd (2010)
Doug Weight (2010)
1991–92 Team (2012)
1993–94 Team (2014)
Mark Astley (2018)
Darrin Madeley (2018)

Players

Current roster 
As of July 30, 2022.

Olympians
This is a list of Lake Superior State alumni were a part of an Olympic team.

Lakers in the NHL
As of July 1, 2022.

Media
All Lake Superior State Lakers hockey games are currently carried on local top 40 radio station WYSS. Since their first season in 1973 (aside from two brief sabbaticals), Lakers games have been called on the radio by Bill Crawford, who previously served in varying public relations and athletic positions from Lake Superior State University from 1988 to 2009, and also hosts the weekly Laker Hockey Show on sister AM station WKNW. Road games, particularly those held in Alaska, are called by the home team's broadcasting crews where needed.

References

External links 
Lake Superior State Lakers men's ice hockey

 
Ice hockey teams in Michigan